Sorvino is a surname derived from the Latin word "sorbum" meaning "tree" or fruit". Notable people with the surname include:

 Bill Sorvino, American stage and screen actor
 Michael Sorvino (born 1977), American actor and producer
 Mira Sorvino (born 1967), American actress
 Paul Sorvino (1939–2022), American actor, opera singer, businessman, writer, and sculptor

See also
Servino, surname

References